Wyoming Highway 351 (WYO 351) is a  east-west Wyoming state road located in central Sublette County. It connects U.S. Route 189 (US 189) with US 191 and mainly serves the hugely important Big Piney-Rock Springs corridor.

Route description
Wyoming Highway 351 begins its western end east of the Big Piney-Marbleton Airport at U.S. Route 189, 2 miles north of Marbleton and 3 miles north of Big Piney. WYO 351 reaches  its eastern terminus at US 191 at just over 24 miles, 11 miles south of Boulder.

Major intersections

References

External links 

 Wyoming State Routes 300-399
 WYO 351 - US 189 to US 191

Transportation in Sublette County, Wyoming
351